"I Don't Need Another Love" is a song by American singer Dionne Warwick and R&B group The Spinners. It was written by Mike and Brenda Sutton and recorded for Warwick's 1989 compilation album Greatest Hits: 1979–1990. Production was overseen by Nick Martinelli. "I Don't Need Another Love" peaked at number 84 on the US Hot R&B/Hip-Hop Songs.

Track listings

Credits and personnel
Credits lifted from the liner notes of Greatest Hits: 1979–1990.

Brenda Sutton – writer
Mike Sutton – writer
Nick Martinelli – producer
The Spinners – vocals
Dionne Warwick – vocals

Charts

References

External links
Dionne Warwick With The Spinners* - I Don't Need Another Love - Discogs

1990 singles
Dionne Warwick songs
1989 songs
Arista Records singles
Song recordings produced by Nick Martinelli